The 2015–16 Syed Mushtaq Ali Trophy was the eighth edition of the Syed Mushtaq Ali Trophy competition, an Indian domestic team only Twenty20 cricket tournament in India. It was contested by 27 teams, divided into 4 groups. Uttar Pradesh remained unbeaten throughout the competition to beat Baroda in the final by 38 runs.

Teams 
The teams were divided into 4 groups:

Group stage

Group A

Points table

Group B

Points table

Group C

Points table

Group D

Points table

Super League

Super League A
Points table

Matches

Super League B
Points table

Matches

Final

Statistics

Batting 
Source: Cricinfo

Bowling
Source: Cricinfo

References

External links 
 Series home at ESPN Cricinfo

Syed Mushtaq Ali Trophy
Syed Mushtaq Ali Trophy